
Year 453 BC was a year of the pre-Julian Roman calendar. At the time, it was known as the Year of the Consulship of Quinctilius and Trigeminus (or, less frequently, year 301 Ab urbe condita). The denomination 453 BC for this year has been used since the early medieval period, when the Anno Domini calendar era became the prevalent method in Europe for naming years.

Events 
 By place 
 Greece 
 Pericles, the ruler of Athens, bestows generous wages on all Athens' citizens who serve as jurymen on the Heliaia (the supreme court of Athens).
 Achaea, on the southern shore of the Corinthian Gulf, becomes part of what is effectively now the Athenian Empire. The Delian League had changed from an alliance into an empire clearly under the control of Athens.

 China 
 May 8 – The Chinese city of Jinyang is severely flooded in the Battle of Jinyang, where the elite families of Jin, Zhao, Zhi, Wei and Han fight. The Wei and the Han swap allegiances to side with Zhao and eliminate the Zhi house, ending the Spring and Autumn period of Chinese history.

Births

Deaths

References